Acrolepiopsis persimilis is a moth of the family Acrolepiidae. It was described by Sigeru Moriuti in 1974. It is found in Japan.

The wingspan is 9–12 mm.

References

Moths described in 1974
Acrolepiidae
Moths of Japan